Noke is a small village and civil parish in Oxfordshire about  northeast of Oxford. It is on the southeast edge of Otmoor and is one of the "Seven Towns of Otmoor". The toponym is derived from Old English and means "at the oak trees".

Noke had a parish church by 1191 but the present Church of England parish church of Saint Giles dates from the first half of the 13th century. At the end of the 16th century a mortuary chapel was added for the Winchcombe family on the north side of the church, but in 1745 the chapel was in a ruinous condition and was demolished.  Noke Parochial School was built in 1863. It was reorganised as a junior school in 1931 and closed in 1946. Noke also used to have a public house, but this too has closed. Both the school and the pub are now private houses.

Notable people 

As of 2020, the writer, actor and director Simon Evans lives in Noke.

References

Sources

External links

Villages in Oxfordshire
Civil parishes in Oxfordshire
Otmoor